Sean Farrell (born in Australia) is an Australian rugby union player who plays for the Queensland Reds in Super Rugby. His playing position is hooker. He has signed for the Reds squad in 2020.

Reference list

External links
Rugby.com.au profile
itsrugby.co.uk profile

Australian rugby union players
Living people
Rugby union hookers
Year of birth missing (living people)
Queensland Country (NRC team) players
Brisbane City (rugby union) players
Queensland Reds players